Marine Clémence Boyer (born 22 May 2000) is a French female artistic gymnast. She is the 2018 Mediterranean Games champion, the 2016 European silver medalist and the 2018 European bronze medalist on the balance beam. She is also the 2018 European and 2018 Mediterranean Games silver medalist and 2016 European bronze medalist with the French team. She represented France at the 2016 and 2020 Summer Olympics. She is the 2016 French all-around champion and an eight-time medalist at the FIG World Cup series.

Early life 
Boyer was born on 22 May 2000 in Saint-Benoît, Réunion to parents Alain and Rolande Boyer but grew up in Melun. She began gymnastics at a club in Melun when she was five years old. In 2011, she began training at the Meaux Gymnastics club, which she still represents at domestic competitions.

Career

Espoir 
Boyer won the silver medal in the all-around behind Loan His at the 2012 French Championships in the Espoir division. She made her international debut at the 2013 International Gymnix in Montreal where she placed sixteenth in the all-around and eighth in the floor exercise final in the Challenge division.

Junior

2014 
Boyer won the silver medals with the Meaux club in the team competition and in the all-around behind Loan His at the French Championships. She competed with the French team at a friendly meet against Romania and Belgium, and they finished third. Individually, Boyer finished seventh in the all-around. Then at the European Championships, the French team finished seventh, and Boyer finished thirteenth in the all-around final. At the Top Gym Tournament, Boyer tied for fifth place in the all-around with Canadian Sydney Soloski. In the event finals, she won the silver medal on the vault behind Angelina Melnikova and the gold medal on the balance beam.

2015 
At the French Championships, Boyer won the gold medal on the balance beam and the silver medal on the uneven bars behind Louise Vanhille. Then at the FIT Challenge in Ghent, she helped France win the team silver medal behind Germany, and she placed sixth in the all-around. She then competed with Juliette Bossu and Mélanie de Jesus dos Santos at the European Youth Olympic Festival in Tbilisi where they placed sixth in the team competition. Boyer qualified for the all-around final where she placed ninth, and she won the gold medal on the vault with a score of 14.275. She won a team gold medal at the Elite Gym Massilia and also placed seventh in the all-around and fourth on vault.

Senior

2016 
Boyer became age-eligible for senior competition in 2016. She made her senior international debut at the City of Jesolo Trophy and finished fourth on the balance beam with a score of 14.700, only 0.050 points behind bronze-medalist Aly Raisman. She was then selected to compete at the Olympic Test Event alongside Marine Brevet, Loan His, Anne Kuhm, Oréane Lechenault, Louise Vanhille. The team finished fourth and qualified for a team spot for the Olympic Games. She won her first World Cup title on the balance beam at the Varna World Challenge Cup. At the European Championships, she competed alongside Marine Brevet, Loan His, Oréane Lechenault, and Alison Lepin, and they won the bronze medal which was France's first European team medal since 2008. Boyer won the silver medal on the balance beam with a score of 14.600, behind Aliya Mustafina and ahead of Catalina Ponor. Then at the French Championships, she won the gold medal in the all-around and the balance beam and placed sixth on the uneven bars. 

Boyer was selected to represent France at the 2016 Summer Olympics alongside Marine Brevet, Loan His, Oréane Lechenault, and Louise Vanhille. Boyer said prior to the Olympics that her goal was to qualify for a final. During the qualification round, the French team finished eleventh, and Boyer qualified for the balance beam final in seventh place with a score of 14.600. In the balance beam final, she finished fourth with a score of 14.600, only 0.133 points behind bronze medalist Simone Biles.

2017 
At the City of Jesolo Trophy, Boyer finished twelfth in the all-around and tied with Flávia Saraiva for the silver medal on the balance beam behind Riley McCusker. She then competed at the European Championships and finished sixteenth in the all-around and seventh on the balance beam. Then at the French Championships, she won the silver medal in the all-around behind Mélanie de Jesus dos Santos and the gold medals on the balance beam and the floor exercise. She won the silver medal on the balance beam at the Paris Challenge Cup behind Romanian Larisa Iordache. At the World Championships, she finished twenty-first in the all-around final. She then won the silver medal in the all-around at the Arthur Gander Memorial behind Hitomi Hatakeda. At the Swiss Cup, she competed on a mixed team with Marian Drăgulescu, and they placed eighth. Then at the Toyota International, she finished sixth on the balance beam and seventh on the floor exercise.

2018 

Boyer won the silver medal on the balance beam behind teammate Mélanie de Jesus dos Santos at the Doha World Cup. Then at the French Championships, she finished fourth in the all-around and on the floor exercise. She was selected to represent France at the 2018 Mediterranean Games in Tarragona, and the French team won the silver medal behind Italy. Boyer won the gold medal on the balance beam with a score of 14.033. At the Sainté Gym Cup, France won the team gold medal against Germany and Switzerland, and Boyer placed seventh in the all-around.

In August, Boyer competed in the European Championships in Glasgow alongside Juliette Bossu, Lorette Charpy, Mélanie de Jesus dos Santos, Coline Devillard, and they finished first in the qualification round. Ultimately, the French team won the silver medal in the final behind Russia and ahead of the Netherlands. Individually, Boyer qualified for the beam final in fifth place. In the final, she won the bronze medal behind Sanne Wevers and Nina Derwael. Then at the 2018 Paris Challenge Cup, she won the silver medal on the balance beam behind Canadian Ellie Black.

Boyer was selected to compete at the World Championships alongside Juliette Bossu, Lorette Charpy, Mélanie de Jesus dos Santos, and Louise Vanhille. The team qualified into the team final which was their first major international team finals since the 2008 Olympic Games, but Boyer narrowly missed qualifying to the beam final and was the first reserve. The French team ultimately finished fifth in the team final which was their best finish at the World Artistic Gymnastics Championships since 1997. After the World Championships, Boyer competed at the Cottbus World Cup and finished sixth on the balance beam.

2019 
At the Baku World Cup, Boyer won the silver medal on the balance beam after losing the execution-score tiebreaker to Australian Emma Nedov. She then won the bronze medal on the balance beam at the Doha World Cup. She qualified for the floor exercise event final at the European Championships and finished eighth.

Boyer competed at the Worms Friendly where the French team finished third behind Germany and Belgium. She then won the silver medal on the floor exercise at the Paris Challenge Cup behind Ukrainian Diana Varinska. Boyer was then named to the team to compete at the World Championships in Stuttgart alongside Lorette Charpy, Mélanie de Jesus dos Santos, Coline Devillard, and Aline Friess. They finished fifth and qualified France for a team spot at the 2020 Olympic Games.

2020-2021 
Boyer was initially scheduled to compete at the 2020 Birmingham World Cup. However, the event was postponed and eventually cancelled due to the COVID-19 pandemic in the United Kingdom. She did not compete in any major international competitions in 2020.

At the 2021 European Championships, Boyer qualified for the all-around final, but she withdrew in order to focus on the balance beam final and because of an ankle injury. She finished sixth in the beam final with a score of 12.866. Then at the Varna Challenge Cup, she won the silver medal on the balance beam behind Anastasiia Bachynska. Then at the French Championships, she won the silver medal in the all-around behind Carolann Héduit. She was then selected to represent France at the 2020 Summer Olympics alongside Héduit, Mélanie de Jesus dos Santos, and Aline Friess. Prior to the Olympic Games, she competed at the FIT Challenge and helped the French team win the gold medal. At the Olympic Games, she helped France qualify for the team final where they finished sixth.

2022
In August, Boyer competed at the European Championships in Munich, where France finished sixth in the team final. Individually, she was the third reserve for the balance beam final.  In September she competed at the Paris World Challenge Cup where she won gold on the balance beam ahead of American Jade Carey.  In October Boyer was named to the team to compete at the World Championships in Liverpool alongside Mélanie de Jesus dos Santos, Coline Devillard, Aline Friess, and Carolann Héduit.

Personal life
Boyer hopes to become a coach after her gymnastics career.

Competitive history

References

External links 

 
 
 

2000 births
Living people
French female artistic gymnasts
Sportspeople from Réunion
Gymnasts at the 2016 Summer Olympics
Olympic gymnasts of France
Mediterranean Games gold medalists for France
Mediterranean Games silver medalists for France
Mediterranean Games medalists in gymnastics
Competitors at the 2018 Mediterranean Games
Gymnasts at the 2020 Summer Olympics
21st-century French women